Manuel Negrete Arias (born 11 March 1959) is a Mexican former professional footballer and manager, who played as a midfielder.

Club career
Negrete became a professional football player in 1980 with Club Universidad Nacional of Mexico, also known as Pumas. His style of play gave him instant recognition among Mexican soccer fans, with Negrete becoming a household name quickly. After the 1986 World Cup, Negrete continued playing in the Mexican Football League, and then reached the European soccer leagues by joining Sporting CP in Portugal and then moving to Sporting Gijón in Spain.

International career
At the 1986 FIFA World Cup finals, Negrete participated in five games and scored one goal in the round of 16 against Bulgaria in the 35th minute, the first of a 2–0 win. The goal has been described as one of the most spectacular in World Cup history by many football fans and journalists which, in April 2018, voted it in FIFA's website as the World Cup's greatest goal. Negrete received a high ball outside the penalty area, controlled it, let the ball bounce once on the ground and combined with Javier Aguirre; the latter returned the ball on the first touch, while keeping it on the air, and Negrete shot it on a scissor kick into the bottom left corner of goalkeeper Borislav Mihaylov.

Career statistics

International goals

Post-playing career
Negrete has led a more quiet life in Mexico since he retired from playing. He worked as coach of the UNAM Pumas youth teams, and later went to Club León as an assistant coach. He became head coach after the firing/resignation of Mario Alberto Garcia.

Honours
UNAM
Mexican Primera División: 1980–81
CONCACAF Champions' Cup: 1980, 1982, 1989
Copa Interamericana: 1981

Atlante
Mexican Primera División: 1992–93

Individual
Mexican Primera División Golden Ball: 1984–85

References

External links

Video of Negrete's goal against Bulgaria in 1986 - www.kenaston.org

1959 births
Footballers from Guerrero
Living people
Club Universidad Nacional footballers
C.F. Monterrey players
Atlante F.C. footballers
Liga MX players
Primeira Liga players
Sporting CP footballers
La Liga players
Sporting de Gijón players
Mexico international footballers
1986 FIFA World Cup players
Mexican football managers
Atlante F.C. managers
Mexican expatriate footballers
Mexican footballers
Mexican expatriate sportspeople in Portugal
Mexican expatriate sportspeople in Spain
Expatriate footballers in Portugal
Expatriate footballers in Spain
Toros Neza footballers
Association football midfielders